The Association for Research in Vision and Ophthalmology (abbreviated ARVO) is an American learned society dedicated to ophthalmology and other vision-related topics. As of 2019, it has almost 12,000 members from 75 different countries. It was established in Washington, D.C., in 1928 as the Association for Research in Ophthalmology. In May 1970, it was renamed to its current name to reflect its broader scope. It is based in Rockville, Maryland. It publishes three academic journals: Investigative Ophthalmology & Visual Science, the Journal of Vision, and Translational Vision Science & Technology.

References

External links

Ophthalmology organizations
1928 establishments in Washington, D.C.
Organizations established in 1928
Organizations based in Maryland
Learned societies of the United States